Salome Alexandra, or Shlomtzion (Šəlōmṣīyyōn; 141–67 BCE), was one of three women to rule over Judea, the other two being Athaliah and Devora. The wife of Aristobulus I, and afterward of Alexander Jannaeus, she was the last regnant queen of Judea, and the last ruler of Judea to die as the sovereign of an independent kingdom.

Family
Salome Alexandra's personal genealogy is not given by Josephus, nor does it appear in any of the books of Maccabees. Rabbinical sources designate the rabbi, Simeon ben Shetah, as her brother, making her the daughter of Shetah as well. Salome Alexandra's oldest son by Alexander Jannaeus was Hyrcanus II who fought his younger brother Aristobulus II in 73 BCE over the Jewish High Priesthood. Hyrcanus II was eventually successful after enlisting the help of the Nabataean king, Aretas III; bribing Roman officials, including Scaurus; and gaining the favour of Pompey the Great, who defeated his brother and took him away to Rome.

Consort
According to the Jewish Encyclopedia, Salome Alexandra was instrumental in arranging the assassination of her brother-in-law, Antigonus, by convincing her husband that his brother was plotting against him.<ref name=je>[http://www.jewishencyclopedia.com/articles/1768-aristobulus-i "Aristobulus I", Jewish Encyclopedia]</ref> Upon the death of Aristobulus in 103 BCE, Aristobulus' widow freed his half-brother, Alexander Jannaeus, who had been held in prison.

During the reign of Alexander, who (according to the historian Josephus) apparently married her shortly after his accession, Alexandra seemed to have wielded only slight political influence, as evidenced by the hostile attitude of the king to the Pharisees.

Political ability
The frequent visits to the palace of the chief of the Pharisaic party, Simeon ben Shetach, who was said to be the queen's brother, must have occurred in the early years of Alexander's reign, before Alexander had openly broken with the Pharisees. Alexandra does not seem to have been able to prevent the persecution of that sect by her husband.

According to archaeologist Kenneth Atkinson, "There are also some passages in the Talmud that say, during her husband's reign, that she protected Pharisees and hid Pharisees from his wrath." Nevertheless, the married life of the royal pair seems to have ended cordially; on his deathbed Alexander entrusted the government, not to his sons, but to his wife, with the advice to make peace with the Pharisees.

Salome Alexandra's next concern was to open negotiations with the leaders of the Pharisees, whose places of concealment she knew. Having been given assurances as to her future policy, they declared themselves ready to give Alexander's remains the obsequies due to a monarch. By this step she avoided any public affront to the dead king, which, owing to the embitterment of the people, would certainly have found expression at the interment. This might have been attended with dangerous results for the Hasmonean dynasty.

 Regent 

Salome Alexandra received the reins of government (76 or 75 BCE) at Jannaeus' camp before Ragaba, and concealed the king's death until the fortress had fallen, in order that the rigour of the siege might be maintained. She succeeded for a time in quietening the vexatious internal dissensions of the kingdom that existed at the time of Alexander's death; and she did this peacefully and without detriment to the political relations of the Jewish state to the outside world. Alexandra managed to secure assent to a Hasmonean monarchy from the Pharisees, who had suffered under Alexander.

Re-establishment of the Sanhedrin

The Pharisees now became not only a tolerated section of the community, but actually the ruling class. Salome Alexandra installed as high priest her eldest son, Hyrcanus II, a man who was wholly supportive of the Pharisees and the Sanhedrin was reorganized according to their wishes and became a supreme court for the administration of justice and religious matters, the guidance of which was placed in the hands of the Pharisees.

Internal and external policy

The Sadducees were moved to petition the queen for protection against the ruling party. Salome Alexandra, who desired to avoid all party conflict, removed the Sadducees from Jerusalem, assigning certain fortified towns for their residence.

Salome Alexandra increased the size of the army and carefully provisioned the numerous fortified places so that neighbouring monarchs were duly impressed by the number of protected towns and castles which bordered the Judean frontier. As well, she did not abstain from actual warfare; she sent her son Aristobulus with an army to besiege Damascus, then beleaguered by Ptolemy Menneus. The expedition reportedly achieved little.

The last days of Salome Alexandra's reign were tumultuous. Her son, Aristobulus, endeavoured to seize the government, and succeeded her after her death.

Prosperity

Rabbinical sources refer in glowing terms to the prosperity which Judea enjoyed under Salome Alexandra. The Haggadah (Ta'anit, 23a; Sifra, ḤuḲḲat, i. 110) relates that during her rule, as a reward for her piety, rain fell only on Sabbath (Friday) nights; so that the working class suffered no loss of pay through the rain falling during their work-time. The fertility of the soil was so great that the grains of wheat grew as large as kidney beans; oats as large as olives; and lentils as large as gold denarii. The sages collected specimens of these grains and preserved them to show future generations the rewards of obedience to the Law, and what piety could achieve.

Name

"Shlomtzion" is sometimes used as a female first name in contemporary Israel. Among others, the well-known Israeli writer Amos Kenan gave the name to his daughter.

During the British Mandate of Palestine, a major street in Jerusalem was called Princess Mary Street, after the only daughter of King George V and Queen Mary. After the creation of Israel, the street was renamed "Queen Shlomzion Street," to commemorate the Jewish queen. Such street names exist also in Tel Aviv and Ramat Gan.

In the 1977 Knesset elections Ariel Sharon accepted the advice of Kenan to name his new political party "Shlomtzion" (it later merged with the Likud).

Israeli zoologists carefully observing the leopards of the Judean Desert bestowed the name "Shlomtzion" on a female leopard whose life, mating, and offspring were the subject of intensive, years-long study.

In medieval sources
According to some versions of the Toledoth Yeshu, a medieval alternative-Christian life of Jesus, Salome is connected with Jesus of Nazareth, placing the death of Jesus 150 years earlier.

See also
Hasmonean coinage

References

Sources
Josephus, Antiquities xiii. 11, § 12; 15, § 16
idem, B. J. i. 5
Heinrich Ewald, History of Israel, v. 392–94
Heinrich Grätz, Geschichte der Juden, 2d ed., iii. 106, 117–29
Ferdinand Hitzig, Geschichte des Volkes Israel von Anbeginn bis zur Eroberung, ii. 488–90
Emil Schürer, Geschichte des jüdischen Volkes im Zeitalter Jesu Christi i. 220, 229–33
Joseph Derenbourg, Essai sur l'Histoire et la Géographie de Palestine, pp. 102–11
Julius Wellhausen, I. J. G. Geschichte Israels pp. 276, 280–85
F. W. Madden, Coins of the Jews, pp. 91, 92
Hugo Willrich, Judaica: Forschungen zur Hellenisch-Jüdischen Geschichte und Litteratur, 1900, pp. 74, 96

External links
 
 Queen Salome Alexandra Entry in Chabad.org Gallery of Our Great
 The Salome No One Knows  Biblical Archaeology Review July/August Issue
 The Jewish Queen Gates of Nineveh''.
  Genealogy of the House of David- Salome Alexandra

Hasmonean dynasty
Ancient queens regnant
141 BC births
Remarried royal consorts
67 BC deaths
1st-century BC Hasmonean monarchs
2nd-century BC women
1st-century BC women rulers
2nd-century BCE Jews
1st-century BCE Jews
Ancient Jewish women
Sanhedrin
Pharisees